Seediq, also known as Sediq, Taroko, is an Atayalic language spoken in the mountains of Northern Taiwan by the Seediq and Taroko people.

Subdivisions
Seediq consists of three main dialects (Tsukida 2005). Members of each dialect group refer to themselves by the name of their dialect, while the Amis people call them "Taroko."
Truku (Truku) – 20,000 members including non-speakers. The Truku dialect, transcribed 德路固  in Chinese.
Toda (Tuuda) – 2,500 members including non-speakers.
Tgdaya (Tkdaya, Paran) – 2,500 members including non-speakers.

Phonology
In Seediq there are 19 consonant phonemes and 4 vowel phonemes. Among these, there are two velar fricatives, one voiceless and the other voiced, and a uvular stop. In both labial and alveolar plosive series, voice opposition is contrastive; velar and uvular series, however, only display voiceless sounds. The alveolar affricate has a marginal phonological status and is found in some interjections (such as teʼcu! "what a mess!"), loanwords and non-finite verbal forms with the gerund prefix cese- (Tsukida 2005: 292, 297).

With the graphemes c and j the practical orthography indicates the palatal allophones of t and d respectively after i and y.

The vowels are the following:

Seediq also has three diphthongs, mainly ay [ai̯], aw [au̯] and uy [ui̯].

Seediq syllables have C, CV, or CVC structures, except for some interjections which have CVCC structures (e.g., saws, which is uttered when offering food to ancestors, and sawp, which is the sound of an object blown by the wind). Disyllabic words can take on the following structures:

CVCV, CVCVC
CVCCV, CVCCVC

Vowels in antepenultimate syllables are often /e/. The stressed syllable is usually the penultimate one, and is pronounced with a high pitch. In the Truku dialect stress is on the final syllable resulting in loss of first vowel in CVCCV and CVCCVC structures, for example compare: qduriq > pqdriqun, lqlaqi > lqlqian. In Taroko, up to six onset consonants are possible: CCCCCVC(VC), for example: tn'ghngkawas, mptrqdug, pngkrbkan, dmptbrinah.

Morphology
As other Austronesian languages, Seediq uses reduplication to convey grammatical functions, such as pluralization and reciprocal verb form derivation. There are two kinds of reduplication: one which involves only the first syllable of the stem, with structure Cə-CV(C), and one which involves the last pair of syllables of the stem excluding codas, having structure CəCə-CV(C)CV(C). Examples are:

Along with reduplication, there are also numerous prefixes and suffixes in Seediq that intervene to alter the meaning of words in derivational and inflectional processes. Affixes include:
 -an: oblique case
 ne-: something possessed by the prefixed noun

Clitics, unlike affixes, do not cause phonological alterations on their roots to which they are attached.

Verbs
Seediq verbs have three types of voices, which are in turn inflected for mood or aspect (Tsukida 2005:313). Nouns, however, do not inflect for voice.
Agent voice – marked by -em- or its allomorphs me or Ø
Goal voice
Conveyance voice

There are four basic aspect/mood categories:
Neutral – same as non-future/imperfective
Perfect – marked by -en-
Non-finite – bare stem
Hortative (i.e., when advising someone) – marked by -a(y/nay)

The future is marked by me-, mpe-, mpe-ke-.

There are a total of five different verb classes (conjugation paradigms). Other verb forms include causatives, reciprocals, and reflexives. Serial verb constructions are also allowed.

Word classes
Truku Seediq has 11 word classes (Tsukida 2005:295).

Open classes
Nouns
Verbs
Adjectives

Closed classes
Numerals
Personal pronouns
Deictics
Adverbs
Conjunctives
Prepositions
Interjections
Sentence final particles

Like many other Formosan and Philippine languages, Seediq nouns and verbs behave similarly. Adjectives can be considered as a subcategory of verbs.

Syntax
The word order of Seediq is verb–object–subject (VOS), where S corresponds to the argument marked with absolutive case.  This argument ordinarily occurs clause-finally, but may be followed by a topicalized ergative argument.  Like many of its other Austronesian relatives, Seediq contains voice morphemes marked on the verb which indicate which of the verb's arguments (agent, patient, etc.) is treated as the subject and thus marked with absolutive case. In noun phrases, modifiers follow the head (Tsukida 2005:304). Unlike Tagalog and many other Philippine languages, there are no linkers connecting the heads and modifiers.

Clauses
There are three types of Seediq clauses (Tsukida 2005):
Interjection clauses
Basic clauses
Existential/possessive clauses

Basic clauses have predicates (usually initial and consisting of single verbs, adjectives, or noun phrases), subjects, and optionally non-subject arguments and adjuncts.

Subjects can be recognized via (Tsukida 2005):
Voice affix
Clitic pronoun
Quantifier floating
Relativization
Possessum demotion

Function words
Some function words are given below:
ni – "and" (conjunction)
deni – "and then" (conjunction)
u, du'u, ga, dega – all meaning "in case that" (conjunction)nasi – "if"
ana – "even"ka – subordinating conjunction, case marker, linker
ini – negator
adi – negates noun phrase predicates, future/perfect verb formswada – pastna'a – "had better, could have done..."dima – "already"hana – "just"ya'asa – "because"niqan – existential predicate (like Tagalog "may")
ungat – negative existential predicate (like Tagalog "wala")

Deictics include (Tsukida 2005:303):niyi – this, this onega/gaga – that, that onehini – herehi/hiya – therega/gaga hiya – over there

There are a total of six prepositions (Tsukida 2005:303):quri – toward, about, in the direction ofpa'ah – frombitaq – until, up tosaw – like
asaw – because ofmawxay – for the sake of

Stative locatives (e.g., "on the mountain") do not take on any prepositions, but are rather placed directly after the verb without any additional marking.

Predicate extenders
Preverbal elements such as adverbs, demonstratives, and prepositions can be used to extend predicates. Below is a partial list of predicate extenders from Tsukida (2008:308).

Extenders that require neutral verb formswada – pastga(ga) – distal progressiveniyi – proximal progressivegisu – progressive, statemeha – future, "is going to do"(me-)teduwa – "be able to do"nasi – "if"na'a – "could have done something but did not
Extenders that require non-finite verb forms
'''asi ~ kasi – "at once, suddenly"
pasi – "at once"
kani – "one did not have to do something but did it"ini – negativeiya – negative imperative
Extenders that require future formssaw – "is/was about to do"
rubang – "was about to do"
Extenders that require future/perfect forms of verbs/nounsadi – negative
Extenders that are combined with adjectives/nounsma'a – "become"
Extenders without specific requirementspekelug – "just"
dima – "already"
hana – "at last"ida – "surely"
ya'a – uncertainty
wana – onlyana – "even"
ma – "why"alung ~ 'alaw ~ 'arang – "as is expected"pida – exactlylengu – "planned to do..."binaw – confirmation
'''atih – "at the last moment," "nearly"
seperang – "purposefully, on purpose"

Pronouns

Numerals
The cardinal numbers are:
kingal
deha
teru
sepat
rima
mataru
mpitu
maspat
mengari
maxal

Other numerals and numeral-related affixes (Tsukida 2005:297):
taxa: used for humans – one person
'uwin: used for objects – one object
ma- -(u)l: used to form words for 10, 20, 30, 40, 50
ma-xa-l: 10
m-pusa-l: 20
me-teru-l: 30
me-sepat-ul: 40
me-rima-l: 50

References

Further reading

 
 
 
  – The alphabets of written Taiwanese aboriginal languages and the corresponding sounds in IPA

External links

 Yuánzhùmínzú yǔyán xiànshàng cídiǎn 原住民族語言線上詞典  – Seediq search page at the "Aboriginal language online dictionary" website of the Indigenous Languages Research and Development Foundation
 Yuánzhùmínzú yǔyán xiànshàng cídiǎn 原住民族語言線上詞典  – Truku search page at the "Aboriginal language online dictionary" website of the Indigenous Languages Research and Development Foundation
 Seediq teaching and leaning materials published by the Council of Indigenous Peoples of Taiwan 
 Truku teaching and leaning materials published by the Council of Indigenous Peoples of Taiwan 
 Seediq translation of President Tsai Ing-wen's 2016 apology to indigenous people – published on the website of the presidential office
 Truku translation of President Tsai Ing-wen's 2016 apology to indigenous people – published on the website of the presidential office

 
Verb–object–subject languages
Truku people
Atayalic languages